The 2016 Syracuse vs. Pittsburgh football game was a regular-season college football game between the Syracuse Orange and the Pittsburgh Panthers, played on November 26, 2016 at Heinz Field in Pittsburgh, Pennsylvania. The game held the record for the most combined points scored in an NCAA Division I Football Bowl Subdivision (FBS) regulation game with 137 total points, breaking the previous record (136 points, set in a 2007 game played between Navy and North Texas) by a single point. The record was broken on November 5, 2022 when the SMU Mustangs defeated the Houston Cougars 77–63 for a combined 140 points.

Before the game

Syracuse
With first-year head coach Dino Babers in command, the Syracuse Orange entered their final game of 2016 with a record of 4–7, 2–5 in ACC play. The Orange had experienced ups and downs throughout the 2016 season, with peaks including wins against seventeenth-ranked Virginia Tech and rival Boston College a week later. However, the lows of the season tended to outweigh the highs, as the Orange defense had allowed at least 20 points in all but two games, and the team had suffered blowout losses at the hands of nationally-ranked Louisville (No. 13), Clemson (No. 3), and Florida State (No. 17). The aforementioned loss to Florida State was Syracuse's seventh of the season, which put a bowl game out of reach coming into their final game.

Pittsburgh
Under second-year head coach Pat Narduzzi, Pittsburgh entered this game 7–4, 4–3 in ACC play, having clinched a bowl game berth the week prior. The Panthers entered their final regular-season with a few very impressive wins on their schedule, namely an early-season win against eventual Big Ten champions Penn State and a road win against eventual national champions Clemson. These two victories proved to be the only two against ranked opponents, however, as they lost at home to No. 25 Virginia Tech on October 27. The Panthers offense had been doing its job throughout the 2016 season, scoring no less than 28 points in each of their previous 11 contests.

Rivalry series

Coming into the game, the Pitt–Syracuse series stood 37–31 in favor of Pitt, with three ties; previously, the highest-scoring meeting in the series was a 45–28 Syracuse win in 1998, totaling 73 points. Pittsburgh had won the last three matchups; furthermore, Syracuse's last victory in Pittsburgh against the Panthers came in 2001, as their two victories in the series since then had come in Syracuse.

Game summary

Game information

Scoring summary

Game statistics

Team statistics

Game leaders

Aftermath
This game was Syracuse's last of the season, as they finished the 2016 campaign with a 4–8 record. Pittsburgh improved to 8–4 and accepted an invitation to the New Era Pinstripe Bowl at Yankee Stadium. The Panthers were favored by five, but fell by seven to Northwestern and finished their season with a record of 8–5.

See also
2007 Navy vs. North Texas football game, the previous record-holder for highest scoring NCAA Division I regulation football game, totaling 136 points.
2001 Arkansas vs. Ole Miss football game, the record-holder for longest NCAA Division I football game, one of four to reach seven overtimes.
2018 LSU vs. Texas A&M football game, the record-holder for highest-scoring game in FBS history, with 146 combined points, and the most recent game to reach seven overtimes.
2022 Houston vs. SMU football game, the current record holder for most points in a NCAA Division I regulation football game, with 140 points

Notes

References

2016 Atlantic Coast Conference football season
vs. Syracuse 2016
vs. Pittsburgh 2016
2016 in sports in Pennsylvania
November 2016 sports events in the United States